In chemistry or mining, polymetal or polymetallic is a substance composed of a combination of different metals. When the substance contains only two metals the term bimetal (bimetallic) is sometimes preferred. A  (or ) is an ore that is the source of more than one metal suitable for recovery. Concretions of manganese and iron (and other metals) found on the ocean floor are called s. They are sometimes called manganese nodules, after their principal component.

See also

References

 

Metals
Mining
Ore deposits